Roy C. Iglesias is a Filipino film writer and director. His most notable works include, among others, the 1976 film Ganito Kami Noon... Paano Kayo Ngayon?, which was directed by National Artist of the Philippines, Eddie Romero, numerous entries in Regal Entertainment's Mano Po anthology film series and historical dramas Yamashita: The Tiger's Treasure, Baler and Manila Kingpin: The Asiong Salonga Story.

Scripts penned by Iglesias have seen him nominated to and winning most of the established Film awards in the Philippines, specifically the Filipino Academy of Movie Arts and Sciences Awards, the Luna Awards (awarded by the Film Academy of the Philippines and often referred to as the FAP awards), the Gawad Urian, Philippine Movie Press Club Star Awards, Young Critics Circle Award and the Metro Manila Film Festival. He was also nominated twice for the EnPress Golden Screen Award, although neither nomination resulted in a win.

Iglesias is a graduate of the University of the City of Manila.

Film
Ganito Kami Noon, Paano Kayo Ngayon? (1976)
Biktima (1990)
Sa Kabila ng Lahat (1991)
Eskapo (co-writer, 1995)
Dahas (1995)
Bakit May Kahapon Pa? (1996)
Nasaan ang Puso (1997)
Babae sa Bintana (1998)
Yamashita: The Tiger's Treasure (2000)
Spirit Warriors (co-writer, 2000)
Hubog (2001)
Mano Po (2002)
Spirit Warriors: The Shortcut (co-writer, 2002)
Filipinas
Mano Po 2: My Home (2003)
Feng Shui (co-writer, 2004)
Sigaw (writer, 2004)
Baler (2008)
Mano Po 6: A Mother's Love (2009)
Bulong (co-writer, 2011)
Manila Kingpin: The Asiong Salonga Story (co-writer, 2011)
The Healing (2012)
Feng Shui 2 (co-writer, 2014)
Shake, Rattle and Roll Fourteen: The Invasion (segment: "Unwanted", 2012)

Stage play
Rama at Sita

Television
GMA Network
Kung Mawawala Ka (2002–2003)
My Only Love (2007–2008)
Saan Darating ang Umaga? (2008–2009)
Obra (Episode: "Boksingera", 2008)

Awards

Metro Manila Film Festival

References

Year of birth missing (living people)
Living people
Filipino film directors
Pamantasan ng Lungsod ng Maynila alumni

GMA Network (company) people